Fox River Grove is a commuter railroad station along Metra's Union Pacific Northwest Line in Fox River Grove, Illinois.

As of April 25, 2022, Fox River Grove is served by 45 trains (22 inbound, 23 outbound) on weekdays, by 30 trains (15 in each direction) on Saturdays, and by 20 trains (nine inbound, all 11 outbound) on Sundays.

The station house is an unmanned modestly decorative shelter that is open 24 hours per day, 7 days a week. Parking is available on both sides of the tracks and on both sides of Lincoln Avenue. On the north side, there are small on-side parking lots between the tracks and the south side of North Northwest Highway. On the south side, much larger parking lots exist on Lincoln Avenue. The southeast parking lot is also accessible to Algonquin Road.

The station underwent a complete rebuild, that extended platforms to 640 ft, (enough for an 8-car train), 2 new passenger shelters, bathroom facilities, repaved parking lot and improved lighting. The total price was $3.5 million, of which $1.2 million came from Union Pacific. The project was completed in the fall of 2013.

Accident 

The vicinity of Fox River Grove station was the site of an October 25, 1995, collision on Algonquin Road involving a Metra train and a school bus, that resulted in the deaths of seven students. The school bus was caught between the railroad tracks and the intersection with US 14, resulting in the accident.

References

External links
Metra - Fox River Grove Station
Station House from Google Maps Street View

Metra stations in Illinois
Former Chicago and North Western Railway stations
Fox River Grove, Illinois
Railway stations in the United States opened in 1959
Railway stations in Lake County, Illinois
Railway stations in McHenry County, Illinois